Margot Boulet (born 13 May 1990) is a French adaptive rower who competes in international rowing competitions. She is a Paralympic bronze medalist and a two-time European medalist.

Accident
Boulet was paralysed following a serious parachuting accident while training in Pau in March 2017. She had fractures in her vertebrae, a broken ankle and multiple bruising and was temporarily paralysed.

References

External links

1990 births
Living people
People from Provins
Paralympic rowers of France
French female rowers
Rowers at the 2020 Summer Paralympics
Medalists at the 2020 Summer Paralympics
Paralympic bronze medalists for France
21st-century French women